The International Union of Anarchists (IAU) was a group of international anarcho-communist organisations. The IAU had national organisations in Ukraine, Russia, Israel, Latvia, Belarus and Spain, individual members in Germany and Sweden, and links to anarchists in Bulgaria, Kazakhstan, Lithuania, France, Tunisia and Syria.

The IUA's main objective was coordinating the efforts of various anarchist organizations to reorganize society according to the principles of federative self-governance.

Background
IUA was founded at a conference on 21 November 2011, attended by representatives from Ukraine, Israel, Germany, Latvia, and Russia. They agreed on a memorandum of association and cooperation, which was the basis upon which later programming, structure, and basic rules of activity were established.

Most of IUA’s members before November 2011 were part of RKAS and separated into autonomous structures because of differences in the goals and methods of anarchist organizations, such as the prefiguration of future free society.

Several months after the conference, a significant number of people joined the IUA. Locally elected councils were then formed. Local councils assign the duties of determining solutions to the problems of both temporary and permanent group coordination. All positions were not constant in the local councils. Therefore, at the local council level, there was a constant reshuffling of posts either by the Board, or upon the personal initiative of the party. At the beginning of 2012, organizations in Spain and Sweden requested and were granted entry into the IUA.

Approach and philosophy
The common goal of IUA members was the elimination of the state, hired labor, inequality, and private property, along with the widespread replacement of commodity-money relations with relations based upon principles of mutual equality and fraternity. This was to be achieved through the collaborative planning of self-managing teams of workers, tenants and consumers, along with the implementation of business activities in accordance with the principle of "from each according to his ability, to each according to his needs in the economic empowerment of society ... ."

The IUA also strived toward the following:
the widespread introduction of direct democracy
the transfer of full key decisions about the public life of assemblies of workers, students, pensioners and other groups (regarded as "oppressed people") to themselves
the creation of coordinating councils for the social control over production, housing, education and all other spheres of life, strictly subordinated to elected assemblies (via binding mandates and the right of withdrawal)
the autonomy of any ethnic and religious communities, provided they reject authoritarian institutions, hierarchies, values of capitalism, and xenophobia.

Activities

 In 2012 members of the IUA were involved in a demonstration for fair elections in Volgograd. In 2013 an activist from the IUA was detained by the Centre for Combating Extremism following a demonstration complaining about the situation of large families in Volgograd.

See also

Other anarchist internationals and international networks
Anarchist St. Imier International (1872–1877)
International Working People's Association (1881–1887)
International Workers Association (1922–)
International of Anarchist Federations (1968–)
Black Bridge International (2001–2004)
International Libertarian Solidarity (2001–2005)
Anarkismo.net (2005–)

References

External links
The International Union of Anarchists

Defunct international anarchist organizations
Libertarian socialist organizations
Organizations established in 2011